The 1972 Auburn Tigers football team under the leadership of coach Ralph "Shug" Jordan completed the regular season with a record of 9–1, earning them an invitation to the Gator Bowl against Colorado, which they won by a score of 24–3.  They completed the season with a record of 10–1 and ranked #5 in the AP poll and #7 in the UPI.

Five players were named all-SEC first team for 1972: defensive back Dave Beck, tail back Terry Henley, offensive tackle Mac Lorendo, defensive end Danny Sanspree, and defensive tackle Benny Sivley.

The famous Punt Bama Punt game took place during the 1972 season, where Auburn, trailing Alabama 16–0 with 10 minutes left in the game, came back to win 17–16 after scoring a field goal followed by two blocked punts that were returned for touchdowns.

Schedule

Rankings

References

Auburn
Auburn Tigers football seasons
Gator Bowl champion seasons
Southeastern Conference football champion seasons
Auburn Tigers football